Mohr im Hemd (literally "Moor in [a] shirt") is an Austrian dessert. It consists of a chocolate pudding topped with whipped cream, hence the name.

In modern times, the dish is often prepared with breadcrumbs to form a solid mass, resembling a lava cake or miniature gugelhupf, and served with chocolate sauce and whipped cream. Older recipes more closely resemble a chocolate custard, with the primary ingredients being chocolate and eggs.

The racial connotations of the dish's name have drawn controversy. In 2012, the human rights organization SOS Mitmensch publicly criticized the name, suggesting replacements such as Kuchen mit Schlag.

References 

Austrian desserts
Almond dishes
Chocolate desserts